Marine Fighting Squadron 221 (VMF-221) was a reserve fighter squadron of the United States Marine Corps.  Originally commissioned during the World War II, it flew the Brewster F2A-3, and after reconstitution in 1943, the F4U Corsair.  The squadron, also known as the “Fighting Falcons”, is most notable for its actions on June 4, 1942, during the Battle of Midway, which resulted in 23 members of the squadron, many posthumously, being awarded the Navy Cross for their actions in combat. VMF-221 ended World War II with 185 air-to-air victories, the second most of any Marine Fighting Squadron in the war.

History

Organization

VMF-221 was formed on July 11, 1941 in San Diego, California. In December of that year, following the attack on Pearl Harbor, they moved to Marine Corps Air Station Ewa in Hawaii. They were originally part of a relief force bound for Wake Island, but were diverted to Midway instead after the force was controversially recalled on 22 December 1941, Wake Island fell on the following day. On March 1, 1942, VMF-221, VMF-222, VMSB-241, and their headquarters units formed Marine Aircraft Group 22 commanded by Lieutenant Colonel Ira L. Kimes.

The squadron’s first taste of combat came on March 10, 1942, when four of its pilots recorded the first aerial victory flying F2A-3's downing an enemy Kawanishi H8K "Emily" flying boat.

By late May, the squadron had been augmented with the arrival of additional aircraft. VMF-221 had 21 F2A-3's and 7 Grumman F4F-3 Wildcats, all of which were essentially worn out "hand-me-down" from the Navy. Leadership of the squadron was passed to Major Floyd B. Parks, with Kimes taking command of Marine Air Group 22. Much has been written of the inferiority of the Brewster fighter, particularly with regard to the Midway engagement. Many of Park's pilots, fresh from flight training Stateside, had very little operational experience. This fact, combined with the overwhelming size and disposition of the Japanese force posed against the atoll's defenses, would have more bearing on the outcome than the operational capabilities of the F2A.

Battle of Midway

On June 4, 1942, during the Battle of Midway, the pilots of VMF-221 were alerted to intercept the incoming formation of Japanese bombers and the 36 escorting Zero fighters that were headed towards the island. Parks led his squadron against the inbound Japanese armada, which combined air groups from Akagi, Kaga, Hiryu, and Soryu. In the lead were the level bombers, a "vee of vees" made up of Nakajima B5N "Kates", followed by the dive bomber formation of Aichi D3A "Vals" at a slightly higher altitude. The fighter escort was "stepped-up" behind the dive bombers, this disposition gave the pilots of VMF-221 a clear shot at the bombers for the first few passes. Once the Zeros were able to engage the Marine fighters, the tables were effectively turned.

When the smoke of the battle cleared, fourteen of the squadron's aviators, including Parks, had been killed in action; four more had been wounded. Only two of VMF-221's remaining 13 aircraft were serviceable, effectively eliminating the squadron as a viable combat unit.  Four of the squadron's ordnancemen were also killed when a Japanese bomb stuck the ammunition area near the airstrip at Midway.  For their actions during the Battle, the squadron, as a component of MAG-22, also received a Presidential Unit Citation.

"For conspicuous courage and heroism in combat at Midway Island during June 1942. Outnumbered five to one, Marine Aircraft Group 22 boldly intercepted a heavily escorted enemy bombing force, disrupting their attack and preventing serious damage to island installations. Operating with half of their dive-bomber's obsolete and in poor mechanical conditions, which necessitated vulnerable glide bombing tactics, they succeeded in inflicting heavy damage on Japanese surface units of a large enemy task force. The skill and gallant perseverance of flight and ground personnel of Marine Aircraft Group 22, fighting under tremendously adverse and dangerous conditions were essential factors in the unyielding defense of Midway.

Two VMF-221 aviators would later become aces during the course of the war. 2nd Lt Charles M. Kunz, who had flown a Brewster F2A in Capt Kirk Armistead's division, was later assigned to VMF-224; he would end the war with 8 confirmed aerial victories. Capt Marion E. Carl, who piloted a Grumman F4F Wildcat at Midway, would later fly with VMF-223, running his score to 18.5 kills.

Rest of the War

Following the Battle of Midway, the squadron was transferred back to Ewa and was one of three Marine fighting squadrons that made up Marine Air Group 21. As new pilots arrived in Hawaii and additional aircraft became available, the squadron was slowly rebuilt. In January 1943, MAG-21 was notified for deployment and the three squadrons were loaded aboard the USS Nassau and transported to Espiritu Santo.  Upon arrival, VMF-214 and VMF-221 sent detachments to Guadalcanal, but VMF-213 was held back and selected to become one of the first squadrons to be equipped with the F4U Corsair. Most of VMF-221's tour at Guadalcanal consisted of combat air patrols over Guadalcanal, but the large raid on April 1, 1943, resulted in Lt James Swett's Medal of Honor action.

After transition to the F4U-1, VMF-221 supported operations during the Battle of Guadalcanal, while also striking Japanese shipping in the vicinity of Bougainville.  During the landing on the first day of the Battle of New Georgia, VMF-221 pilots got credit for shooting down 16 Japanese aircraft. In December 1943, they were sent back to the states for another reorganization.

The squadron's final combat deployment was from January 24, 1945 to June 6, 1945, aboard the USS Bunker Hill.

Reserve years
VMF-221 was recommissioned on April 1, 1946 as part of the Marine Corps Reserve.  The squadron trained at throughout the 1950s and was decommissioned in June 1959 when the base was closed.

Squadron aces

The following members of VMF-221 were credited with at least 5 enemy aircraft shot down:

Other notable members
 Marion E. Carl, first Marine Corps ace in World War II
 Albert E. Hacking JR., Became an Ace on his first enemy engagement, credited with 4 confirmed kills, on that mission. Later he would go on to receive 6, Distinguished Flying Crosses, amongst other Medals in WWII, and Korea.  
 Harold W. Bauer, Medal of Honor recipient for actions in the later Battle of Guadalcanal

See also
 United States Marine Corps Aviation
 List of decommissioned United States Marine Corps aircraft squadrons

Citations

References
Bibliography

 

Web

 VMF-221 at Midway
 USMC Fighting Squadrons
 List of WW2 Marine Aces
 After Action report of 2ndLT William Brooks
 Brewster F2A-3 Buffalo
 Air Units List

Fighting221
Inactive units of the United States Marine Corps